Urodeta faro is a moth of the family Elachistidae. It is found in Cameroon.

The wingspan is 6–6.6 mm. The thorax, tegula and forewing are white, irregularly dusted with brown. There is a small brown spot on the fold before the middle of the wing. The hindwings and fringe are greyish. Adults have been recorded in late April and early May.

Etymology
The species name is derived from the type locality, the floodplain of the Faro River.

References

Endemic fauna of Cameroon
Elachistidae
Moths described in 2011
Insects of Cameroon
Moths of Africa